Wemyss Bight is a settlement in South Eleuthera, the Bahamas. At the 2010 census, the population was 335.

Notable people
Georgianna Kathleen Symonette (1902–1965), suffragist
Chris Brown (1978–), sprinter

References

Populated places in the Bahamas